Markus Keusch (born 24 May 1993) is an Austrian professional footballer who plays as a midfielder for Austrian Football Second League club SKU Amstetten.

References

External links 

Living people
1993 births 
Austrian footballers
2. Liga (Austria) players
SKU Amstetten players
Association football midfielders